Westbrook may refer to:

Places

Australia
 Westbrook, Queensland, a town south-west of Toowoomba.

New Zealand
 Westbrook, New Zealand, a suburb of Palmerston North

United Kingdom
 Westbrook, Berkshire
 Westbrook, Kent, part of Margate
 Westbrook, Herefordshire
 Westbrook, Warrington, a council ward in Warrington, Cheshire
 Westbrook, Wiltshire, a settlement in the civil parish of Bromham, Wiltshire

United States
 Westbrook, Connecticut, a town in Middlesex County
 Westbrook, Maine, a town in Cumberland County
 Westbrook, Minnesota, a town in Cottonwood County
 Westbrook, Missouri, a ghost town
 Westbrook, Texas, a city in Mitchell County

Transportation
Westbrook station (Calgary), CTrain station in Calgary, Alberta, Canada
Westbrook station (Minnesota), in Westbrook, Minnesota, United States
Westbrook (Shore Line East station), in Westbrook, Connecticut, United States
Westbrook railway station (England), former station in Dorstone, Herefordshire, England
Westbrook railway station, Auckland, former station in Auckland, New Zealand

Other uses
Westbrook (surname)
Westbrook, Suffolk County, New York, large estate house listed on the National Register of Historic places in Great River, New York, US
Westbrook Van Vorhis (1903-1968), American voice actor.
Westbrook Pegler (1894–1969), American journalist 
Westbrook Intermediate School, a middle school in Houston, Texas, US